Dadra and Nagar Haveli and Daman and Diu Football Association (DDFA) is the state governing body of football in the union territory of Dadra and Nagar Haveli and Daman and Diu. It is affiliated with the All India Football Federation, the national governing body.

District FAs

Daman and Diu

Daman and Diu Football Association (DDFA) is the district governing body of football in the Daman and Diu district of the union territory of Dadra and Nagar Haveli and Daman and Diu.

Dadra and Nagar Haveli

Dadra and Nagar Haveli Football Association (DNHFA) is the district governing body of football in the Dadra and Nagar Haveli district of the union territory of Dadra and Nagar Haveli and Daman and Diu.

Competitions
 Dadra & Nagar Haveli Senior Division League
 Daman and Diu Senior Division League

References

Football in Dadra and Nagar Haveli and Daman and Diu
Football governing bodies in India
2022 establishments in India
Sports organizations established in 2022